Bunchosia is a genus in the Malpighiaceae, a family of about 75 genera of flowering plants in the order Malpighiales. It contains roughly 75 species of trees and shrubs, which are native to dry woodlands, savannas, and wet forests. Their range extends from Mexico and the Caribbean to southeastern Brazil and adjacent Argentina. Bunchosia is one of three arborescent genera of Malpighiaceae with fleshy, bird-dispersed fruits.

Selected species
 Bunchosia argentea (Jacq.) DC. – silver peanut butter fruit, marmelo, mountain plum (ciruela del monte). A wild species with leaves abaxially sericeous, giving a silvery appearance.
 Bunchosia armeniaca (Cav.) DC. – cansaboca, friar's plum (ciruela del fraile). 
 Bunchosia biocellata Schltdl.
 Bunchosia cauliflora W.R.Anderson
 Bunchosia cornifolia Kunth
 Bunchosia costaricensis Rose
 Bunchosia fluminensis – cachita, muchita or cafezinho do mato. Flavour resembles corn and papaya.
 Bunchosia glandulifera (Jacq.) Kunth – peanut butter fruit. Most popular and widespread species in cultivation.
 Bunchosia glandulosa (Cav.) DC.
 Bunchosia hartwegiana Benth.
 Bunchosia hookeriana A.Juss.
 Bunchosia jamaicensis Urb. & Ndz.
 Bunchosia lindeniana A.Juss.
 Bunchosia linearifolia P.Wilson
 Bunchosia mcvaughii W.R.Anderson
 Bunchosia pallescens Skottsb. – usama or pale bunchosia.
 Bunchosia praecox W.R.Anderson
 Bunchosia sonorensis Rose
 Bunchosia tutensis Dobson

Formerly placed here
 Malpighia mexicana subsp. guadalajarensis (S.Watson) F.K.Mey. (as B. guadalajarensis S.Watson)

References

External links

Malpighiaceae Malpighiaceae - description, taxonomy, phylogeny, and nomenclature
Bunchosia

 
Malpighiaceae genera
Taxonomy articles created by Polbot